Fetească can refer to

 One of the following traditional Romanian/Moldovan wine grapes or wines:
 Fetească Albă
 Fetească Neagră
 Fetească Regală
, a village in Leuşeni Commune, Hînceşti district, Moldova